Rostami (also Romanized as Rostamī and Rustami) is a village in Angali Rural District, in the Central District of Bushehr County, Bushehr Province, Iran. At the 2006 census, its population was 136, in 29 families.

References 

Populated places in Bushehr County